The East Bank is the part of the Southern Levant east of the Jordan River, mostly contained in present-day Jordan.

East Bank may also refer to:

Places
 East Bank, West Virginia, a town in the US
 Nicollet Island/East Bank, Minneapolis, a neighborhood in Minneapolis, US
 Eastbank Esplanade, a pedestrian and bicycle path in Portland, Oregon, US
 Banda Oriental, a historic region covering modern Uruguay and southern Brazil
 East Bank, an educational and cultural development within Queen Elizabeth Olympic Park, London

Education
 Eastbank Academy, a secondary school in Glasgow, Scotland
 East Bank, a campus of the University of Minnesota, Minneapolis, US
East Bank station, a light rail station serving the East Bank campus

See also
 Southport Eastbank Street railway station, Southport, Merseyside, England
 Eastern Bank (disambiguation)